This is a list of public holidays in Svalbard. Public holidays in Svalbard are regulated by the Norwegian Annual Holiday Act, which was amended in 2014 to include workers employed in the mining and fishing industries, as well as all public and private sectors.

Besides, 24 December is commonly observed as Christmas Eve, 31 December is commonly observed as New Year's Eve. On these dates, private sectors always take half-day off to their employees after noon.

References

Svalbard
Svalbard